Blastobasis deae is a moth in the  family Blastobasidae. It is found in Costa Rica.

The length of the forewings is 5.9–7.5 mm. The forewings are pale greyish brown intermixed with greyish-brown scales and greyish-brown scales tipped with pale greyish brown. The hindwings are translucent brown, gradually darkening towards the apex.

Etymology
The specific epithet is derived from Latin dea (meaning goddess).

References

Moths described in 2013
Blastobasis